Jack Laskey is an English actor best known for his theatre work and his role as DS Jakes in the ITV drama series Endeavour. He is the third son of Michael Laskey, a poet. Laskey trained at the Royal Academy of Dramatic Art (RADA).

Television 
Laskey played a recurring TV role as DS Peter Jakes in the ITV series Endeavour.

Between 2015 and 2017, Laskey played the role of Alfred Graves 'a young man with a gentle soul' who 'is burdened with an uncommon condition - synesthesia in the TV show X Company.

Other television credits include Squirrel Huntin' Sam McCoy in the Emmy Award-nominated Hatfields And McCoys, directed by Kevin Reynolds and Kevin Costner.

Laskey played the role of the Photographer in Joseph Pierce's animation A Family Portrait.

Film
He made his film debut in 2011 as Carruthers in Guy Ritchie's Sherlock Holmes: A Game of Shadows.

Laskey played the lead role of Konrad in producer Peter Fudakowski's 2014 adaption of Joseph Conrad's short story The Secret Sharer. Almost half of the lines Laskey speaks in the film are in Mandarin - a language he had no previous knowledge of before starting work on the film.

In 2015 he appeared in the Julian Jarrold film A Royal Night Out, which starred Rupert Everett and Emily Watson.

Theatre
With the Royal Shakespeare Company in 2008, he played Bassanio in Tim Carroll's The Merchant Of Venice; Biondello in The Taming Of The Shrew; and Robert Hooke in Riot Group co-founder Adriano Shaplin's The Tragedy Of Thomas Hobbes, directed by Elizabeth Freestone.

Laskey has played at Shakespeare's Globe theatre: he worked with artistic director Dominic Dromgoole on two productions, playing four characters in Trevor Griffiths's "A New World: A Life Of Thomas Paine" and Octavius Caesar in "Antony And Cleopatra"; for two seasons he played Bernard of Clairvaux in Howard Brenton's In Extremis, directed by John Dove; and in Thea Sharrock’s 2009 production of "As You Like It". He received an Ian Charleson Award Commendation for his performance as Orlando.

He has toured internationally with the Young Vic theatre in two major productions: Luc Bondy's 2010 production of Schnitzler's "Sweet Nothings", in which he took the role of Theodore; and in 2011 he played The Other in Jon Fosse's two hander "I Am The Wind", Patrice Chéreau's only ever English language production.

In 2013 at the Arcola theatre, Lasky played the role of Platonov in Helena Kaut-Hausen's production of "Sons Without Fathers", which received a positive review from Michael Billington.

His early theatre credits include Romeo in Romeo and Juliet (English Theatre of Vienna), Cornelius/Reynaldo in Hamlet (Old Vic), Carney in Biloxi Blues (Couch Potato Productions), Juliet in an all-male production of Romeo and Juliet (Blood in the Alley), and Hamlet in Hamlet (Haymarket Theatre Basingstoke).

Filmography

Film

Television

References

External links
 
 

1982 births
Living people
20th-century English male actors
21st-century English male actors
Actors from Ipswich
Alumni of RADA
English male film actors
English male stage actors
English male television actors
English male Shakespearean actors